Pozhva is a rural locality (a settlement) and the administrative center of Pozhvinskoye Rural Settlement, Yusvinsky District, Perm Krai, Russia. The population was 3,131 as of 2010. There are 69 streets.

Geography 
Pozhva is located 75 km east of Yusva (the district's administrative centre) by road. Ust-Pozhva is the nearest rural locality.

References 

Rural localities in Yusvinsky District